Geoffrey Osborne Marshall  (born 5 January 1948 in Rossett)  is the former Dean of Brecon.

Marshall was educated at Repton School and Durham University; and was ordained after a period of study at the College of the Resurrection, Mirfield. After curacies in Waltham Cross and Welwyn Garden City he held incumbencies in Derbyshire before becoming the Canon Missioner at Derby Cathedral.  He was Area Dean of Wrexham from 2002 to 2008.

References

1948 births
People from Denbighshire
People educated at Repton School
Alumni of the College of the Resurrection
Deans of Brecon Cathedral
Living people
20th-century Welsh Anglican priests
21st-century Welsh Anglican priests
Alumni of St John's College, Durham